This list of works by Robert Lawson categorises and provides brief details of the structures designed by Scottish-born architect  Robert A. Lawson (1833–1902) who is said did more than any other designer to shape the face of the Victorian era architecture of the city of Dunedin.

Lawson designed an estimated 46 church buildings, 21 banks, 134 houses, 16 school buildings, 13 hotels, 15 civic and institutional buildings, and 120 commercial and industrial buildings. Of these 94 survive, including 46 in Dunedin, 43 in the rest of New Zealand and five in Melbourne.

Among the buildings which Lawson personally designed, collaborated on or supervised the design of are:

Unless they are significant, alterations to existing houses are not listed.

References

External links
 Inspired: The Dunedin Architecture of R.A. Lawson. A map and information guide to the architectural highlights of R.A. Lawson in the city of Dunedin.
 Lawson: The man behind the name. 

Lawson
Lawson